Group 4 may refer to:
Group 4 element, chemical element classification
Group 4 (racing), classification for cars in auto racing and rallying 
G4S, formerly Group 4 Securicor, a prominent British security company
IB Group 4 subjects, subject group for the experimental sciences in the International Baccalaureate program
 Group 4 image format, Group 3 & Group 4 are digital technical standards for image compressing and sending in faxes, and in the Tagged Image File Format (TIFF)
Group of Four, the Group of Four (also known as G4) is a coalition of Brazil, Germany, India and Japan, who seek to reform membership in the United Nations Security Council
Group 4 (company), a defunct British security company
"Group Four", a song from Massive Attack's album, Mezzanine